Cloudy Bay Rural LLG is a local-level government (LLG) of Central Province, Papua New Guinea.

Wards
01. Boru
02. Doma
03. Robinson River
04. Si'ini
05. Duramu
06. Ganai
07. Amau
08. Ianu
09. Domara
10. Baramata
11. Tutubu
12. Merani
13. Manabo
14. Dom
15. Cocoalands
85. Moreguina Urban

References

Local-level governments of Central Province (Papua New Guinea)